The Weaver's Mill Covered Bridge is a covered bridge that spans the Conestoga River in Lancaster County, Pennsylvania, United States. The ,  bridge was built in 1878 by B. C. Carter and J. F. Stauffer across Conestoga River.  It is also known as Isaac Shearer's Mill Bridge.

The bridge has a single span, wooden, double Burr arch trusses design with the addition of steel hanger rods. It is painted red, the traditional color of Lancaster County covered bridges, on both the inside and outside.  Both approaches to the bridge are painted in the traditional white color.

The bridge's WGCB Number is 38-36-02.  Added in 1980, it is listed on the National Register of Historic Places as structure number 80003511.  It is located at  (40.14117, -75.99783).

Dimensions
Length: 85 feet (25.9 m) total length
Width: 15 feet (4.6 m) total width

Gallery

See also
Burr arch truss
List of crossings of the Conestoga River
List of Lancaster County covered bridges

References

Further reading

Covered bridges in Lancaster County, Pennsylvania
Bridges completed in 1878
Covered bridges on the National Register of Historic Places in Pennsylvania
Bridges over the Conestoga River
National Register of Historic Places in Lancaster County, Pennsylvania
Road bridges on the National Register of Historic Places in Pennsylvania
Wooden bridges in Pennsylvania
Burr Truss bridges in the United States
1878 establishments in Pennsylvania